Jiangkedong railway station  is a station on the Chinese Qingzang Railway.

See also
 List of highest railway stations in the world
 Qingzang Railway
 List of stations on Qingzang railway

Railway stations in Qinghai
Stations on the Qinghai–Tibet Railway